Moses Waiswa Ndhondhi (born 20 April 1997) is a Ugandan international footballer who plays for SuperSport United, as an attacking midfielder.

Club career
Born in Kampala, he has played club football for Växjö United and Vipers. He signed for Vipers in January 2017. He won the 2017–18 Uganda Premier League with the club.
In January 2020 he signed for South African club SuperSport United. On 25 January 2020 he made his debut for SuperSport United against Chippa United.

International career
He made his international debut for Uganda in 2017. He scored on his debut after receiving a call-up to the national team which came to him as a surprise.

Honours
2017–18 Uganda Premier League

References

1997 births
Living people
Ugandan footballers
Ugandan expatriate footballers
Uganda international footballers
Växjö United FC players
Vipers SC players
SuperSport United F.C. players
Uganda Premier League players
South African Premier Division players
Association football midfielders
Ugandan expatriate sportspeople in Sweden
Ugandan expatriate sportspeople in South Africa
Expatriate footballers in Sweden
Expatriate soccer players in South Africa
Sportspeople from Kampala
Uganda A' international footballers
2018 African Nations Championship players
2022 African Nations Championship players